Capbreton  is a commune in the Landes department in Nouvelle-Aquitaine in southwestern France. Located at the mouth of the Boudigau and Bourret rivers, the town is situated about 40 km north of Biarritz.

The town is a popular holiday destination for sailors, surfers, and beach-goers.

Population

Twinning
Capbreton is twinned with Portuguese city Nazaré.

See also
Communes of the Landes department

References

Communes of Landes (department)